Western Togoland is an unrecognised state which is internationally recognised by the international community as a part of Ghana. It claims five the Volta and Oti Regions. In 25 September 2020 separatists in Western Togoland declared independence from the Republic of Ghana. Western Togoland has been a member state of the Unrepresented Nations and Peoples Organization (UNPO) since 2017.

History
The German Empire established the Togoland protectorate in 1884. Under German administration, the protectorate was regarded as a model colony or Musterkolonie and experienced a golden age. During the First World War in 1914, Britain and France invaded the protectorate. After the German defeat and the signing of the Treaty of Versailles, the western part of Togoland became a British mandate, British Togoland, and the eastern part became French Togoland. After the Second World War British Togoland became a United Nations Trust Territory that was under British administration. In the 1956 British Togoland status plebiscite, 58% of the western Togolese voted to integrate into what would in 1957 become independent Ghana. 

On May 9, 2017, the Homeland Study Group Foundation unsuccessfully tried to declare the independence of Western Togoland. On May 7, 2019, the  national executive of the Volta separatist group, Homeland Study Group Foundation (HSGF/FGEP), Emmanuel Agbavor has rejected claims that the group had a militia.

Independence 
On September 25, 2020, secessionists demanded that Ghanaian Security forces leave the Volta Region after attacking several police stations in the North Tongu District of the Volta Region. In a press statement declaring their secession from Ghana, the Homeland Study Group Foundation under the leadership of Charles Kormi Kudzordz declared sovereignty over the area. The Government of Ghana did not take the declaration seriously, viewing it as a "joke", although prominent security expert Adib Sani urged the government to treat the issue as a national security risk. There have been injuries and deaths in the clashes following the declaration of independence though the Republic of Ghana claims to have gained intel on those clashes before they occurred. Ghana sources claim the secessionist group heading the independence movement, the Homeland Study Group, is under control. However, the secessionists took over arms and set up road blockades. The president of the Republic of Ghana has denied negotiating with the secessionists.

Demographics

About 11 million people live in Western Togoland. Languages of Western Togoland include French, Ewe,  Ga, Dangme, and English. The main religions are Christianity, Islam, and Voodoo. The majority of the people in this region are ethnic Ewés.

Reactions 
Ghana and other nations consider this movement could lead to an undesired adverse reaction. The WTRF could follow in the wake of other secessionist movements in the region such as those in Anglophone Cameroon, which quickly turned into an open armed conflict with the Cameroonian government. This risk could be combined with others, such as the expansion of Jihadist movements.

See also
 Ghana-Togo border
 Western Togoland Rebellion

References

External links
 BRIEF HISTORY OF WESTERN TOGOLAND

Regions of Ghana
Togoland
1957 in Ghana
Independence movements
French-speaking countries and territories
States with limited recognition
Disputed territories in Africa
Countries in Africa